Myriam Sophia Lakshmi Quinio (born 16 July 1991), known professionally as Paris Laxmi is a dancer and actress born in France and settled in Kerala, India.
With her husband Kathakali dancer Pallippuram Sunil, she runs the Kalashakti School of Arts in Vaikom, Kerala.

Biography 
Paris Laxmi was born in Aix-en-Provence, France to Yves Quinio, a drama artist and poet and Patricia Quinio, a sculptor. Her younger brother Theo – Q.Narayan, is a drummer in classical orchestra drums as well as Indian drums like Tabla and Mridangam. He trained under Mridangam Maestro Thiruvarur Bakthavathsalam, who gave his sister her stage name: 'Paris Laxmi'. Laxmi expressed her desire to dance even before she walked and never lost the passion for it. She visited India with her family annually since the age of 5. Due to their parents' attraction to India, Laxmi and her brother received a bi-cultural education, between France and India.

In France, she started training in Bharatanatyam with Armelle Choquard (disciple of Sri V.S. Muthuswami Pillai and Smt. Sucheta Chapekar) from the age of 9 and later from Dominique Delorme (disciple of Sri V.S. Muthuswami Pillai and Padma Subrahmanyam). She also trained under Smt. Sucheta Chapekar in Pune and at Dr. Padma Subrahmanyam's Nrithyodaya School of Dance in Chennai.

On September 14, 2012, at Vaikom Mahadeva temple, she married Pallippuram Sunil, Kathakali dancer from Kerala. Together they created in 2012 the Kalashakthi School Of Arts and inaugurated a theatre cum-class-room, the Kalashakthi Mandapam in 2014 in Vaikom, Kerala where they both teach their respective dance forms and organise Art performances and workshops.

Paris Laxmi made her debut in Amal Neerad's Big B and then gained attention by her role in Anjali Menon's Bangalore Days as Kuttan's Michelle.

Dance career 
Paris Laxmi has been trained in various dance styles: Ballet, Jazz, Contemporary, Flamenco and Hip-hop from the age of five; and Bharatanatyam from the age of nine.

Laxmi is an active and well-known dancer who has performed throughout India and abroad as a Bharatanatyam soloist and with her husband Pallippuram Sunil.

Sunil and Laxmi created the duet 'Sangamam' in 2012 and in 2015 their first creation, Krishna Mayam, a classical dance fusion of Kathakali and Bharatanatyam showcasing stories and manifestations of Lord Krishna with compositions from the Kathakali and Bharatanatyam repertoires. 'Sangamam - Krishna Mayam' has toured all over India, Gulf countries and Europe since 2015 for various temples, theatres, associations and festivals like Soorya Festival.

Laxmi has also presented a Contemporary dance creation called 'Seasons on Earth' in 2016 at Kalashakti Mandapam in Vaikom and the Kerala Museum in Kochi; and a Flamenco dance creation in 2017 at Kalashakti Mandapam and Kala Ghoda Festival, Mumbai.

Filmography

Television

References

External links
 Official Facebook Page
Paris Laxmi Entralls Audience
Paris Laxmi wins hearts at Kalabharathi Fest Kalbharathi Cultural Heritage India

Living people
1991 births
French emigrants to India
Actresses in Malayalam television
Actresses in Tamil cinema
French film actresses
Indian film actresses
Actresses from Kerala
People from Vaikom
People from Aix-en-Provence